The College of the Rockies is a Canadian public community college, located in the southeast corner of British Columbia, Canada.  The main campus is in Cranbrook, with regional campuses in Creston, Fernie, Golden, Invermere, and Kimberley. Canada

Programs
The college offers a full range of programs – both in-class and online – in the areas of university studies, adult basic education, health, child youth and family studies, administrative studies, tourism, computer technology, fire services, and trades.

On June 16, 2010, the College announced its first four-year degree program, the Bachelor of Business Administration in Sustainable Business Practices. This announcement marked a significant milestone in the 35 year development of College of the Rockies.

Location
The College serves a regional population of approximately 82,700 people who live within a large 45,000 square kilometre area.  The region, known as the Rocky Mountain Trench, features high mountain ranges separated by ecologically significant valleys and water systems.

History

1970s

Recognizing the need for apprenticeship training, in 1971, James Patterson, a hard rock miner in the Sullivan Mine in Kimberley, BC and member of the local School Board, initiated the process of establishing a local vocational school.

East Kootenay Community College was established on May 8, 1975 with an edict from the government that the main campus be constructed in Cranbrook. The number of registered students that first year was 351 in Cranbrook, 64 in Kimberley, 52 in Fernie, 39 in Golden and 37 in Invermere.

Funding for a $1.4 million College campus building was announced in February 1978. Sod turning for the facility took place in April 1980. While the new campus building was being constructed, the college operated out of 17 different locations in Cranbrook.

1980s

The official opening of the Cranbrook Campus took place September 20, 1982, and within the decade new facilities were also completed for the Invermere Campus (March 1988) and the Fernie Campus (October 1989).

1990s

 
Associate Degrees in Arts and Sciences were offered for the first time in the 1993 academic year, and the Purcell House student residence was completed in 1995.

In 1995 East Kootenay Community College changed its name to College of the Rockies (COTR). COTR's first on-line course, Applied Research Methods, was offered in January 1997.

In 1997/98, the College introduced the Avalanche men's and women's volleyball teams as the latest members of the BC Colleges' Athletics Association.

The trade-mark with the words `College of the Rockies` was filed with the Canadian Trade-marks database on 1997-10-15.

21st century
College of the Rockies` Arms were registered with the Canadian Heraldic Authority on March 1, 2000.

A new childcare facility, Kids on Campus, was completed in October 2002. In November 2004, a wireless network for student laptops was introduced at the Cranbrook Campus.

In 2007, the Cranbrook Campus completed a $16.2 million (CDN) expansion, with a new Academic building and a new Trades facility.

In 2009, COTR was granted $12.7 million (CDN) from the Federal and Provincial governments as part of the Knowledge Infrastructure Program, in order to expand and upgrade buildings at the Cranbrook campus. This project was completed ahead of schedule in October, 2010. View video of grand opening.

Student population

In the 2011/12 instructional year, College of the Rockies served 2,282 full-time equivalent students – 1,769 funded students, 112 entry-level trades training students and 401 apprentices as well as 137 international full-time equivalent students from 30 countries.

Scholarships & Bursaries
The Government of Canada sponsors an Aboriginal Bursaries Search Tool that lists over 680 scholarships, bursaries, and other incentives offered by governments, universities, and industry to support Aboriginal post-secondary participation. College of the Rockies scholarships for Aboriginal, First Nations and Métis students include: Awards for Aboriginal Women;

Economic Impact

As shown in the highlights below, a 2007 study found that College of the Rockies has a significant economic impact on its college region.
 Students enjoy an attractive 13% annual return on their investment of time and money.
 For every $1 the students invest in COTR, they receive a cumulative of $2.40 in higher future earnings over the course of their working careers (after discounting).
 Taxpayers see a real money return of 21% on their annual investments in COTR.
 The Province of British Columbia benefits from improved health and reduced welfare, unemployment, and crime, saving the public some $649,800 per year each year that students are in the workforce.
 The COTR Service Area economy receives roughly $133.8 million in income each year due to the annual activities of COTR and the cumulative effects of its past students. This figure amounts to 4.3% of total income in the regional economy.

Notes

References
 O'Keefe, T. et al. (Eds.). (2000). Continuing the commitment: a reflection of our first twenty-five years. Cranbrook: Desktop Graphics.
 Day, Chris, & McBride, Craig. "$12.7M Expands College of the Rockies Campus" , Office of Canada's Transport and Infrastructure Minister, April 8, 2009. 
 "Institutional Accountability Plan and Report - 2008/09 Reporting Cycle", College of the Rockies, 2009. 
 Christophersen, Kjell A., & Robison, M.Henry. "Economic Contribution of College of the Rockies - Analysis of Investment Effectiveness and Economic Growth", CCbenefits Inc., August 2007.

See also
List of institutes and colleges in British Columbia
List of universities in British Columbia
Higher education in British Columbia
Education in Canada

Cranbrook, British Columbia
Colleges in British Columbia